The 1989 Men's Hockey Asia Cup was the third edition of the Men's Hockey Asia Cup, the quadrennial international men's field hockey championship of Asia organized by the Asian Hockey Federation. It was held from 20 to 28 December 1989 in New Delhi, India.

The two-time defending champions Pakistan won the tournament for the third time by defeating the hosts India 2–0 in the final. South Korea won the bronze medal by defeating Japan 2–0.

Preliminary round 
All times are (UTC+5:30).

Group A

Group B

Classification round

Fifth to eight place classification

First to fourth place classification

Semi-finals

Third place game

Final

Final standings

See also
 1989 Women's Hockey Asia Cup

External links
 http://www.rediff.com/sports/asiacup89.htm

Hockey Asia Cup
1989 in Indian sport
1989 in field hockey
International field hockey competitions hosted by India
December 1989 sports events in Asia